Morus Dwyfach (fl. c. 1523–1590) – otherwise, Morus ap Dafydd ab Ifan ab Einion – was a Welsh-language poet. He was domestic bard to the Griffith family at Cefnamlwch on the Llŷn Peninsula in Gwynedd and took his bardic name from the River Dwyfech (now known as the Dwyfach).

References

16th-century Welsh writers
16th-century male writers
Welsh-language poets
Welsh poets
Year of birth uncertain
1590 deaths